Peter Newlove (born 27 December 1947) is an English former professional footballer who played as a right half.

Career
Born in Bradford, Myers joined Bradford City as an apprentice in 1963. He joined the senior team in January 1966, making 3 league appearances for the club He was released by the club in 1967.

Sources

References

1947 births
Living people
English footballers
Bradford City A.F.C. players
English Football League players
Association football wing halves